The voiced uvular plosive or stop is a type of consonantal sound, used in some spoken languages.

 is a rare sound, even compared to other uvulars. Vaux (1999) proposes a phonological explanation: uvular consonants normally involve a neutral or a retracted tongue root, whereas voiced stops often involve an advanced tongue root: two articulations that cannot physically co-occur. This leads many languages of the world to have a voiced uvular fricative  instead as the voiced counterpart of the voiceless uvular plosive. Examples are Inuit; several Turkic languages such as Uyghur and Yakut; several Northwest Caucasian languages such as Abkhaz; several Mongolic languages such as Mongolian language and Kalmyk language as well as several Northeast Caucasian languages such as Ingush.

There is also the voiced pre-uvular plosive in some languages, which is articulated slightly more front compared with the place of articulation of the prototypical uvular plosive, though not as front as the prototypical velar plosive. The equivalent X-SAMPA symbols are G\_+ and g_-, respectively.

Features

Features of the voiced uvular stop:

Occurrence

See also
 Index of phonetics articles

Notes

References

External links
 

Uvular consonants
Pulmonic consonants
Voiced oral consonants
Central consonants